The Partisan Leader; A Tale of The Future is a political novel by the antebellum Virginia author and jurist Nathaniel Beverley Tucker.  A two-volume work published in 1836 in New York City and in 1837 in Washington, D.C. under the pen-name "Edward William Sydney," the novel is set thirteen years into the future, in 1849, and imagines a world where the American states south of Virginia (South Carolina, North Carolina, Georgia, Louisiana, Texas, Arkansas, Mississippi, and Florida) have seceded from the Union.  The story traces the formation of a band of Virginia insurgents who seek to free their state from federal control and adjoin it to the independent Southern Confederacy.

Ever since the Southern states actually withdrew from the Union in 1861, the work has been viewed as a window into the development of secessionist thought, and, in some ways, a preview of the American Civil War. In 1861, it was reprinted in New York City with the title A Key to the Disunion Conspiracy. A Confederate edition was published in Richmond in 1862.

Notes

Bibliography
Robert J. Brugger, Beverley Tucker: Heart over Head in the Old South (Baltimore: Johns Hopkins University Press, 1977).
Beverley D. Tucker, Nathaniel Beverley Tucker: Prophet of the Confederacy, 1784-1851 (Tokyo: Nan'undo, 1979).

External links
 Documenting the American South - The full text of The Partisan Leader

1836 American novels
American political novels
Novels about American slavery